Zdeněk Čáp (born June 12, 1992) is a Czech professional ice hockey defenceman. He currently plays with Mountfield HK of the Czech Extraliga.

Čáp made his Czech Extraliga debut playing with HC Pardubice during the 2013–14 Czech Extraliga season.

References

External links

1992 births
Living people
Czech ice hockey defencemen
HC Dukla Jihlava players
HC Dynamo Pardubice players
HC Olomouc players
HC ZUBR Přerov players
LHK Jestřábi Prostějov players
Stadion Hradec Králové players
Sportspeople from Kolín